Love Returns is a 2004 Italian comedy-drama film directed by Sergio Rubini.

For her performance Giovanna Mezzogiorno won the Nastro d'Argento for best supporting actress.

Cast 

 Fabrizio Bentivoglio: Luca Florio
 Margherita Buy: Silvia
 Sergio Rubini: Giacomo
 Giovanna Mezzogiorno: Lena
 Eros Pagni: Professor Mangiacane
 Antonio Prisco: Picchio
 Antonello Fassari: Sergio
 Simona Marchini: Flora
 Umberto Orsini: Dr. Ambrosini
 Michele Placido: Dr. Bianco
 Mariangela Melato: Federica Strozzi

See also 
 List of Italian films of 2004

References

External links

2004 films
Italian comedy-drama films
2004 comedy-drama films
Films directed by Sergio Rubini
2000s Italian films